The  is a medium duty truck produced by Isuzu since 1959. Outside Japan it is known as N series and Q Series. The range was originally mainly available in Japan and other Asian countries. Australia was another important market for the Elf and N series – to the extent that it was manufactured there from the 1970s using many local components. Since the early 1980s, it has also been sold and built in the United States (under the Chevrolet and GMC brand as a W-Series), and also as the Isuzu N-Series. Only North America receives the wide-cab version, competing with the Avia D90/D120, Hino Dutro, Hyundai HD65/HD72/HD78, Iveco Daily, Mazda Titan, Mercedes-Benz Vario, Mitsubishi Fuso Canter, Nissan Atlas, Renault D-Truck, Tata LPT 613, Toyota Dyna, and the ГАЗ-3310 Валдай.

For the common Andinian market (including Chile and Peru), the truck has been assembled in the GM-Colmotores assembling plant in Bogotá, Colombia since 1991, with annual quantities already of 20,000 up to 60,000 units. Local assembly has been increasing because of increasing demand in the Colombian and neighboring markets. It carries "Tecnología Isuzu" (with Isuzu Technology) lettering.

In Indonesia, Philippines and several other countries, the Elf is not only used as a truck, but also converted into microbuses by local body makers. The lighter four-wheeled models are commonly used as an intercity Angkot or Jeepney (share taxis), as a school bus, or as an employee bus.

First generation

The cab-over  Elf (TL221) was originally introduced in August 1959. It had single headlights and rear-hinged doors. This carries the TL251 chassis code.

In 1962 the engines were updated, and were now rated at  respectively. The chassis codes were changed to TL321/351 for the diesel version, reflecting the installation of the all new DL201 engine. A little later on, the chassis codes were reorganized and were now TLG10/11 for the petrol models and TLD10/11 for the diesels. In 1964, the long wheelbase model became the standard version. In 1965, the Elf received a facelift, now having twin headlights.

Isuzu ended up offering a very wide variety of bodyworks for the first generation Elf. These include the original integrated bed, as well as a separate truckbed with dropsides. There was a double-cab version available, as well as special bodywork for dedicated purposes such as a soda truck, a dumper, and a tanker. There was also a "Route Van" model with a glazed rear compartment and seating either three or six passengers, as well as the "Elf Bus" which was available in two models from 1960. The Elf Light Bus has integrated bodywork with the long wheelbase and seats 21 passengers (chassis codes BL171/271 for the diesel/petrol) while the Elf Micro Bus fits into the very narrow slot between the Route Van and the Light Bus. The Micro Bus originally had the Route Van's bodywork but was more passenger-oriented (seating 12 or 15). It carried the TL121/151/21/251B chassis codes, and from 1961 it received its own rear bodywork with bigger glazing. The Elf Bus later became its own line, called the Isuzu Journey.

Second generation

This was the first of the second generation Elfs to be introduced, heavier duty models soon followed and replaced the first generation variants.

In April 1968, the second generation Elf appeared (TL21/TLD21 series). A walk-through van ("Elf Hi-Roof") was also introduced, another first for Japan. In October 1970, this part of the range became the Elf 150 while the regular Elf (2-2.5 tonnes) became the Elf 250; the 250 was updated to a 2.4-litre diesel engine. This was combined with the introduction of the heavier duty,  Elf 350. This re-shake of the lineup was then followed by the very modern Elf Mi-Pack in April 1972. Because of its high price combined with customer reluctance to a front-wheel drive truck it was retired after only a few years on the market. Instead a low-floor model of the Elf 150 was added to the lineup in 1974, featuring small twinned rear tires.

The heavier duty Elf 350 was not immediately replaced but continued in production until the 1980 model year, when in February a 350 model of the third generation Elf was introduced ("350 Wide").

Third generation

The third generation Elf arrived in June 1975. Initial models were the Elf 150 and 250. It was nicknamed "Tora-san" after Kiyoshi Atsumi's (a famous Japanese actor) most beloved film character which supposedly looked similar. In January 1977, a 250 Low-Flat model was added, followed in 1978 by a facelift and an altered front grille. In 1979 a bigger 3.3-liter version of the  Elf 250 was introduced, called the "Elf 250 Super". There was also an "Elf 150 Super" version, which has the larger, 2.4-liter C240 diesel engine which was usually installed in the Elf 250. In 1978, Isuzu also sold their millionth Elf. In January 1980, the Elf was updated to meet Japan's 1979 emissions standards, which was also when the design was changed to accommodate a tilting cab. The Elf 250 Wide and 350 Wide were added, with KT and KS chassis codes respectively, meaning that the second generation Elf 350 could finally be retired.

In 1981, the Elf range underwent another facelift, with an updated dashboard as well. For the third generation Elf the diesel engines had been modernized for more ease of operation, while the world's then smallest direct injection diesel engine - the 3.3-liter 4BC2 - was also introduced. It arrived in 1982 and replaced the less powerful 4BC1 which had been introduced in 1979. In March 1983, the diesel engines were again modified, reflecting new Japanese emissions standards for commercial vehicles. While the third generation Elf was mostly replaced in 1984, the "Route Van" (three- or six-seater van version) continued in production until the early 1990s. With the same bodywork there was also a more habitable bus version available; this was marketed as the Isuzu Journey S and was based on the Elf 150 (KAD51ZB).

Fourth generation

The fourth generation Elf range appeared in July 1984. This generation of the Elf was exported widely across the world and manufactured in several different countries, including the United States. The fourth Elf/N series originally had twin rectangular headlamps and a grille with five separate segments (seven for the Wide Cab models). In February 1987, a facelifted version with a grille of only two larger segments appeared, at which time the engine lineup was also altered. This was followed by a second facelift in June 1990, after which the grille became a single. lower opening and the headlights were changed to more aerodynamic, single-piece units. This generation was the last to be-rebadged as  a Bedford in Australian and European markets, some months after the discontinuation of the similar Bedford TK and TL trucks, with the Isuzu badge used from 1992, although UK variants were still assembled at the IBC (Isuzu Bedford Company) Vehicles plant.

In Japan, this generation was only offered with direct injection diesel engines, introducing the new 2.8-liter  4JB1 family industrial version with dual mode transmission depending in application and the 3.6-liter 4BE1 direct injection engine for the Elf 250 and Elf 350 NPR. which replaced the long running 4BA1 as the standard Elf 150 10 ft. And Elf 150 14 ft. 6 wheel. In September 1987, a 16 ft. heavier version Elf 350 wide was added to the range. The Elf 250 was originally only available with the  4BE1 engine. Later, the long stroke 4BD1 direct injection engine with or without a turbocharger was added to the Elf 250, as was a four-wheel drive version with dual mode manual transmission.

This model was also manufactured in China, by BLAC (Beijing Light Automobile Corporation) from 1984 until 2002. Later it was also built by YCACO, a subsidiary of Guangzhou. After a company reorganization it has been built by them as the Guangzhou Hino 300J (YC5040XXY) since 2008, with a redesigned front and various other improvements.

United States
In the US it was sold as the Chevrolet Tiltmaster and as the GMC Forward, which replaced their L series which had been introduced in 1960. These trucks arrived for the 1984 model year and had a  turbodiesel straight-six engine. It was also the first model to use the long-running Isuzu N-series label. In 1986 a heavier duty  8.4-litre diesel version of the Forward (W7) was added to the US market. The Forward and the Tiltmaster were offered as Class 3 or Class 5 trucks, with  GVWR respectively. The smaller Tiltmaster/Forward W4 has a  diesel inline-four engine while the heavier W6 received a  six-cylinder diesel. These models were also sold as the Isuzu NPR/NRR respectively, with Isuzu adding the "Flatlow" model with low-profile 15-inch rear tires for a lower frame height.

While US sales of the Chevrolet-badged Spectrum passenger cars always exceeded those of Isuzu's own corresponding model, the Chevrolet/GMC-badged trucks sold slower than their Isuzu counterparts. In 1986, for instance, 507 W4 Tiltmasters and 1,292 W4 Forwards were sold, as against 4,954 equivalent NPRs (2,267 GM-badged W7s were also sold; Isuzu did not market a version of this truck). In 1986, Isuzu and General Motors also combined their systems for importing and distributing these trucks rather than importing them separately.

In 2009 both the Chevrolet Kodiak and the Isuzu H-Series trucks were discontinued, with the W-Series taking their place.

Fifth generation

The fifth generation Isuzu Elf appeared in July 1993, with more sculpted headlights. The 2.8 4JB1 and 4JB1T are standard on  both Elf 150 10 ft/14 ft and Elf 250 along with 3.6 4BE1. The non-turbo 4JB1 featured a new VE Rotary injection pump which increase power to 90 PS. In May 1995 it received a minor change, including upgraded, cleaner diesel engines. The H-series 4.0-liter 4HE1 and 4.3-liter 4HF1. The 16 ft chassis with an H-series engine was standard while the 14 ft version was optional and is still in production. An OEM deal with Nissan led to the Elf also being badged as a Nissan Atlas H41/ H42 and a Nissan Diesel Condor 20/30/35 beginning at this time, followed by the Nissan Atlas Max from 1996 until 2000. The Atlas Max was based on the new, lighter-dutyElf 100 (June 1995) which was available with a 2.0-liter petrol, or a 2.5 or 2.7-liter diesel engine.

The bonneted version (walk through van) of Isuzu ELF also exists as Isuzu ELF UT, . It was sold only in Japan. Mechanically wise, it only came with 3.1-liter 4JG2 and 4.3-liter 4HF1 engines, and available only in rear-wheel drive. Production of Isuzu ELF UT began in 1996 and ended in 2001. The ELF UT was also rebadged as Nissan Atlas Max. The successor of Isuzu ELF UT was Isuzu Begin , which was based on Isuzu Rodeo frame. Isuzu Begins were produced from 2001 to 2004.

In the United States, the Elf maintained the four rectangular halogen headlights from the 4th generation through 2005. 2006 and early year 2007 Models had facelifted trapezoidal headlights. The Elf was marketed as the Isuzu NPR and Chevrolet/GMC W series, each available with either the 4BD2T 3.9-liter turbo Diesel engine until 1998, the 4HE1 4.8-liter turbo Diesel engine from 1998 to 2004, the 4HK1 5.2-liter turbo Diesel engine from 2005. It then became available with GM's 5.7-liter L31 Vortec or GM's 6.0-liter LQ4 Vortec engine with 4L80-E Automatic Transmission.

In May 2004, subsequent to a few minor changes, the Elf underwent a major facelift with new and larger trapezoidal headlamps. Another OEM deal was forged at this time and the Elf was now also marketed as the Mazda Titan in parallel.

In Malaysia, this truck is manufactured by Heavy Industries Corporation of Malaysia (Isuzu HICOM Malaysia) under the name of HICOM Perkasa, but carrying the Isuzu N-Series Commando badge. It was introduced in 1996 and discontinued in 2011, 15 years after its inception.

Sixth generation

The sixth generation Elf/N series was introduced in December 2006 (High Cab and Wide Cab) and February 2007 (Regular Cab). By the time the full range was available, the fifth generation Elf was retired. This was also assembled in Colombia (alongside the heavier F series), where it was sold as the Chevrolet NKR, NPR, or NQR. The sixth generation model was also rebadged as the Nissan Atlas H43 in Japan.

The headlight-turnsignal cluster is now configured in the shape of the Isuzu "twin bar" logo, which was used from 1974 to 1991. In North America, GM sold the Isuzu N series as the Chevrolet and GMC W-Series until 2009. In 2016, it reintroduced the model as the Low Cab Forward (LCF) series, named simply the Chevrolet 3500, 4500, or 5500, and available with the same gasoline or diesel engines.

The 6th generation was indroduced to Malaysia in 2014.

Seventh generation 
The seventh generation Elf/N series was presented in March 7th 2023, in Japan, now with an EV version available.

Nomenclature
The branding is Elf in its home market of Japan and some others including Mexico and Indonesia.

In most markets however, it is known as the N-Series.

The second letter denotes weight rating,

H, L, K = regular cab.      M = high cab.      P, Q, R = wide cab.

The third letter denotes drivetrain layout;

R  =  rear-wheel drive.      S  =  four-wheel drive.

The Elf is sold as an Elf in some markets aside from the domestic Japanese, such as Mexico and Indonesia, but in most export markets it is called the Isuzu N series and Q Series.

See also
 Isuzu Forward
 Isuzu Giga
 List of Isuzu engines
 List of Low Cab Forward trucks
 Wienermobile
 Wrightspeed
 Chevrolet Silverado

References

Works cited

External links

 

 Chevrolet Low Cab Forward Trucks (US) (rebadged Isuzu Elf)

Cab over vehicles
Hybrid trucks
Elf
Vehicles introduced in 1959